Gregory Wayne Hubick (November 12, 1951 - December 4, 2013) was a Canadian professional ice hockey defenceman/left wing who played for the Toronto Maple Leafs and Vancouver Canucks in the National Hockey League (NHL). He also spent several years with the Dallas Black Hawks of the minor Central Hockey League.

Playing career
Hubick played two seasons for University of Minnesota Duluth. Selected in the 1971 NHL Entry Draft by the Montreal Canadiens, Hubick was traded to the Toronto Maple Leafs almost immediately after the 1975 NHL Entry Draft took place. The Canadiens acquired the Maple Leafs' second-round choice, center/left wing Doug Jarvis.

Hubick played one full season with the Maple Leafs, and then spent the next four seasons in the minors, primarily with the Dallas Black Hawks of the Central Hockey League. Hubick signed with the Vancouver Canucks in 1979 but played only five games with the Canucks during the 1979–80 NHL season. He played the rest of his career in the minors until he retired in the early 1980s.

Career statistics

Regular season and playoffs

References

External links

Profile at hockeydraftcentral.com

1951 births
2013 deaths
Canadian ice hockey defencemen
Dallas Black Hawks players
HC Ambrì-Piotta players
Ice hockey people from Saskatchewan
Montreal Canadiens draft picks
Nova Scotia Voyageurs players
People from Rural Municipality McKillop No. 220, Saskatchewan
Toronto Maple Leafs players
Vancouver Canucks players
Weyburn Red Wings players
Wichita Wind players